The German Volcano Route or, less commonly, German Volcano Road is a 280-kilometre-long tourist route from the River Rhine to the mountains of the High Eifel. It links 39 sites within the Geopark Vulkanland Eifel in the Volcanic Eifel (Vulkaneifel), at which geological, cultural-historical and industrial-historical nature and cultural monuments on the subject of volcanicity in the Eifel are located.

The project was carried out in 2008 in cooperation between the counties of Ahrweiler, Bernkastel-Wittlich, Cochem-Zell, Mayen-Koblenz and Vulkaneifel. The choice of the 39 stations was made by the German Vulcanology Society (Deutsche Vulkanologische Gesellschaft, DVG).

Route

Literature 
Overview map 1:100,000 series, State Office for Survey and Geobasis Information (Landesamt für Vermessung and Geobasisinformation) Rheinland-Pfalz, 
d´Hein: Nationaler Geopark Vulkanland Eifel. Ein Natur- and Kulturführer. Gaasterland-Verlag, Düsseldorf, 2006, 
Wolfgang Blum, Wilhelm Meyer: Deutsche Vulkanstraße. Görres Verlag, Koblenz, 2006,

External links 
German Volcano Road

German tourist routes
Eifel